Adelpherupa pontica is a moth in the family Crambidae. It was described by Koen V. N. Maes in 2002. It is found in Cameroon, the Democratic Republic of the Congo (Katanga), South Africa and Uganda.

References

Moths described in 2002
Schoenobiinae
Moths of Africa